Hello Young Lovers may refer to:

"Hello, Young Lovers" (song), a 1951 song by Rodgers and Hammerstein
Hello Young Lovers (Nancy Wilson album), 1962
Hello Young Lovers (Jimmy Durante album), 1965
Hello Young Lovers (Sparks album), a 2006 album by Sparks
Hello Young Lovers, a 1987 compilation album by Frank Sinatra
"Hello Young Lovers", an episode of Rising Damp